Swedish Touring Car Championship (STCC) was a touring car racing series based in Sweden, but also with rounds in Norway. They began operating in 1996, heavily influenced by the British Touring Car Championship and the success of BTCC racing on Swedish television. There are also a number of support classes that compete with their races alongside STCC; Radical, the Camaro Cup, Superkart, Pro Superbike, the JTCC and the Porsche Carrera Cup Scandinavia. The final STCC season was in 2010, as the series merged with the Danish Touringcar Championship to form the Scandinavian Touring Car Championship.

Rules
The cars are built according to the Super 2000 rules used in the FIA WTCC. A national counterpart, N2000, also exists to encourage teams to build their own cars without having to have them homologated by FIA. So far Audi, Volvo, Opel, and Mercedes have constructed their own cars.

Points System (as of 2006)

Qualifying & Race
Every racing weekend consist of the following:
 Qualifying: First, a 20-minute qualifying session open to all drivers is run. The eight fastest drivers in the 20 minute session go on to drive in the Super pole. Drivers from 9th quickest and backwards start in the qualifying order for the first race. The grid for the second race is reversed results of top eight from the results of the first race. The cars behind top eight start in the position they finished in race one.
 Super Pole: Super pole is a one-lap shootout for the first eight grid positions of race one. The driver with the 8th fastest qualifying time is the first to run a Super Pole lap. Each of the remaining seven drivers run their Super Pole lap in order of slowest to fastest.  In the end, the driver with the fastest Super Pole lap starts the race from pole, or first, position.
 Race: There are two races in a race weekend and each race is approximately 20 minutes in length. All races start using a rolling start.

TV Coverage
STCC was first aired in 1997 on SVT, featured in the program called "Race" along with the British Touring Car Championship. BTCC was dropped by SVT at the end of the 1999 season and was replaced by CART, while STCC stayed. When BTCC, which had been the main focus of Race, was dropped, STCC was upgraded to be the series which the program had its focus on. Previously when BTCC and STCC clashed, the STCC races were shown in-between the two BTCC races. This was changed for the 2000 season, and now CART was shown in-between the two STCC races. In 2002 VEIDEC Trophy, a motorcycle class that raced on the STCC-weekends, replaced CART on the program. All Race programs were either 30 or 45 minutes in length, depending on if one or two series were featured.
In 2003 STCC coverage moved from SVT to TV4. The program was now shown on TV4 Plus, a channel which not everyone had access to (at the time only SVT1, SVT2 and TV4 was available to all viewers for free). TV4 only kept STCC for a year, selling it to TV3. The races appeared again in a highlights format on TV3 during 2004, but in 2005 the coverage was extended to include several hours of live coverage from each race weekend on the TV3-owned sports channel Viasat Sport.
In 2006 STCC returned to SVT and Race, again being available to all viewers, but coverage was cut down to only a 30-minute highlight program.
Nowadays the competition is broadcast by another TV3-owned channel, Viasat Motor.

Car brands
The cars competing in the STCC are (as of 2010): Alfa Romeo, BMW, Chevrolet, Honda, Opel, Peugeot, Seat, Volkswagen and Volvo.

Champions

References

External links
STCC official site
TouringCarTimes - STCC news in English

 
Touring car racing series
1996 establishments in Sweden
2010 disestablishments in Sweden